Olli Ahvenlahti (born 6 August 1949, in Helsinki) is a Finnish pianist, composer and conductor. He is of Russian descent.

Ahvenlahti succeeded Ossi Runne as the Finnish conductor at the Eurovision Song Contest for the 1990 Contest.  In all, he conducted seven entries until the 1998 Contest (after which the orchestra was abolished) - the exceptions being the 1995 Contest and the 1997 Contest in which Finland did not participate.  At these contests, Ahvenlahti was part of the Finnish commentary team.

He has played alongside a large number of Finnish artists, most notably the UMO Jazz Orchestra in the 1970s.

During the 1990s he worked for the Finnish radio and television company YLE.

References

External links

 Olli Ahvenlahden verkkosivut
 YLE Elävä arkisto: Olli Ahvenlahti livenä

1949 births
Living people
Musicians from Helsinki
Finnish conductors (music)
Finnish pianists
Finland in the Eurovision Song Contest
Eurovision Song Contest conductors
Finnish jazz pianists
Finnish jazz composers
Finnish people of Russian descent
21st-century conductors (music)
21st-century pianists